T'uru Pampa (Quechua for polished, slippery, also spelled Thuru Pampa) is a mountain in the Bolivian Andes which reaches a height of approximately . It is located in the Chuquisaca Department, Azurduy Province, Tarvita Municipality. T'uru Pampa lies at the Rumi Jich'asqa River, southwest of Llusk'a.

References 

Mountains of Chuquisaca Department